Naseh-ye Tanbaku Kar (also Romanized as Naseh-ye Tanbāḵū Kār) is a village in Jastun Shah Rural District, Hati District, Lali County, Khuzestan Province, Iran. At the 2006 census, its population was 110, in 17 families.

References 

Populated places in Lali County